Rico Lamar Reese (born April 5, 1983 in East Point, Georgia) is a professional Arena Football League player who is currently a free agent.  He played college football at Western Carolina University.  Reese was a 1st Team All Southern Conference selection his senior season.

Reese played professionally with AFL's Alabama Vipers, Kansas City Command, and Georgia Force. He currently is also a Health/Personal Fitness teacher for East Cobb Middle School.

References 

 "Rico Reese Career Stats"
 "ESPN Rico Reese college profile" 
 "Two Former Catamounts prepare for AFL conference championship"
 "Birmingham Steeldogs"
 "All-Socon Team"

Living people
1983 births
American football defensive linemen
Tulsa Talons players
Alabama Vipers players
Georgia Force players
Kansas City Command players
Western Carolina Catamounts football players